In European politics, the term Euroregion usually refers to a transnational co-operation structure between two (or more) contiguous territories located in different European countries. Euroregions represent a specific type of cross-border region.

Scope
Euroregions usually do not correspond to any legislative or governmental institution and do not have direct political power. Their work is limited to the competencies of the local and regional authorities which constitute them. They are usually arranged to promote common interests across the border and to cooperate for the common good of the border populations.

Criteria
The Association of European Border Regions sets the following criteria for the identification of Euroregions:

 an association of local and regional authorities on either side of the national border, sometimes with a parliamentary assembly
 a transfrontier association with a permanent secretariat and a technical and administrative team with own resources
 of private law nature, based on non-profit-making associations or foundations on either side of the border in accordance with the respective national law in force
 of public law nature, based on inter-state agreements, dealing among other things, with the participation of territorial authorities

It is difficult to associate one legal framework with the term "Euroregion", as they operate across country borders and vary widely in their particular forms.

Naming conventions
The naming convention for Euroregions is as varied as the forms of the regions themselves.

List of Euroregions
The cooperating regions usually have different (local) names in each participating country. The regions are listed in alphabetical order of the corresponding English names. Listed are also the particular participating countries and the year the euroregion was founded.

See also
Eurodistrict
European Grouping for Territorial Cooperation
British–Irish Council
North/South Ministerial Council

References

External links
 Council of Europe: euroregions
 Euroregion "Dnipro"

 
Regional policies of the European Union
Cross-border regions